Dapani is a village in the commune of Bandrele on Mayotte. It is located near the Pointes et plages de Saziley et Charifou protected area on the south-east of Mayotte. The protected area includes Dapani Beach and mangroves, and is a notable bird habitat known for its "botanical trail" through the mangroves.

References

Populated places in Mayotte